Frederikstad is a hamlet in South Africa some 34 km south-west of Carletonville and 23 km north of Potchefstroom. It was established in 1885 and named after Frederik Wolmarans. Fighting took place here during the Second Anglo-Boer War. The name is also encountered as Frederickstad.

References

Populated places in the JB Marks Local Municipality